Kumarlı is a village in the district of Çarşamba, Samsun Province, Turkey. Located 12 km from the Black Sea coast it is 3km distant from the center of Çarşamba and the distance between this village and the provincial capital of Samsun is 39 km. Its population in 2000 was 315 people.

References
https://web.archive.org/web/20101027185129/http://earthsearch.net/featureIndex.php?type=int&start=2581000&end=2582000
https://web.archive.org/web/20070628234601/http://plasma.nationalgeographic.com/mapmachine/
http://www.fallingrain.com/world/TU/55/Kumarli.html

Villages in Çarşamba District